Tristan and Iseult, also known as Tristan and Isolde and other names, is a medieval chivalric romance told in numerous variations since the 12th century. Based on a Celtic legend and possibly other sources, the tale is a tragedy about the illicit love between the Cornish knight Tristan and the Irish princess Iseult. It depicts Tristan's mission to escort Iseult from Ireland to marry his uncle, King Mark of Cornwall. On the journey, Tristan and Iseult ingest a love potion, instigating a forbidden love affair between them.

The story has had a lasting impact on Western culture. Its different versions exist in many European texts in various languages from the Middle Ages. The earliest instances take two primary forms: the courtly and common branches, associated with the 12th-century poems of Thomas of Britain and Béroul, the latter believed to reflect a now-lost original version. A subsequent version emerged in the 13th century in the wake of the greatly expanded Prose Tristan, merging Tristan's romance with the legend of King Arthur. Finally, after the revived interest in the medieval era in the 19th century under the influence of Romantic nationalism, the story has continued to be popular in the modern era, notably Wagner's operatic adaptation.

Narratives

The story and character of Tristan vary between versions. His name also varies, although Tristan is the most common modern spelling. The earliest tradition comes from the French romances of Thomas of Britain and Béroul, two poets from the second half of the 12th century. Later traditions come from the vast Prose Tristan, markedly different from the tales of Thomas and Béroul.

After defeating the Irish knight Morholt, the young prince Tristan travels to Ireland to bring back the fair Iseult (often known as Isolde, Isolt, or Yseult) for his uncle King Mark of Cornwall to marry. Along the way, Tristan and Iseult ingest a love potion which causes them to fall madly in love. The potion's effects last a lifetime in the legend's courtly branch. However, in the common branch version, the potion's results end after three years.

In some versions, Tristan and Iseult ingest the potion accidentally. In others, the potion's maker gives it to Iseult to share with Mark, but she gives it to Tristan instead. Although Iseult marries Mark, the spell forces her and Tristan to seek each other as lovers. The King's advisors repeatedly try to charge the pair with adultery, but the lovers use trickery to preserve their façade of innocence. In Béroul's version, the love potion eventually wears off, but the two lovers continue their adulterous relationship.

Like the Arthur–Lancelot–Guinevere love triangle in the medieval courtly love motif, Tristan, King Mark, and Iseult all love one another. Tristan honors and respects his uncle King Mark as his mentor and adopted father. Iseult is grateful for Mark's kindness to her. Mark loves Tristan as his son and Iseult as a wife. However,  every night each has horrible dreams about the future. Simultaneous to the love triangle is the endangerment of a fragile kingdom and the end of the war between Ireland and Cornwall (Dumnonia).

King Mark eventually learns of the affair and seeks to entrap his nephew and wife. Mark acquires what seems to be proof of their guilt and resolves to punish Tristan by hanging and Iseult by burning at the stake. However, Mark changes his mind about Iseult and lodges her in a leper colony. Tristan escapes on his way to the gallows, making a miraculous leap from a chapel to rescue Iseult.

The lovers flee into the forest of Morrois and take shelter there until Mark later discovers them. They make peace with Mark after Tristan agrees to return Iseult to Mark and leave the country. Tristan then travels to Brittany, where he marries  Iseult of the White Hands, daughter of Hoel of Brittany, for her name and beauty. In some versions, including Béroul and the Folie Tristan d'Oxford, Tristan returns in disguise for Iseult of Ireland, but their dog, Husdent, betrays his identity.

Association with Arthur and death

The earliest surviving Tristan poems include references to King Arthur and his court. Mentions of Tristan and Iseult are also found in some early Arthurian texts. Writers expanded the connection between the story and the Arthurian legend over time. Shortly after the completion of the Vulgate Cycle (the Lancelot-Grail cycle) in the first half of the 13th century, two authors created the Prose Tristan, which establishes Tristan as one of the most outstanding Knight of the Round Table. Here, he is also portrayed as a former enemy turned friend of Lancelot and a participant in the Quest for the Holy Grail. The Prose Tristan evolved into the familiar medieval tale of Tristan and Iseult that became the Post-Vulgate Cycle. Two centuries later, it became the primary source for the seminal Arthurian compilation Le Morte d'Arthur.

In the popular extended version of the Prose Tristan, and the works derived from it, Tristan is attacked by King Mark while he plays the harp for Iseult. Mark strikes Tristan with a poisoned or cursed lance, mortally wounding him, and the lovers die together. The poetic treatments of the Tristan legend, however, offer a very different account of the hero's death, and the short version of the Prose Tristan and some later works also use the traditional account of Tristan's death as found in the poetic versions.

In Thomas' poem, Tristan is wounded by a poisoned lance while attempting to rescue a young woman from six knights. Tristan sends his friend Kahedin to find Iseult of Ireland, the only person who can heal him. Tristan tells Kahedin to sail back with white sails if he is bringing Iseult and black sails if he is not (perhaps an echo of the Greek myth of Theseus). Iseult agrees to return to Tristan with Kahedin, but Tristan's jealous wife, Iseult of the White Hands, lies to Tristan about the color of the sails. Tristan dies of grief, thinking Iseult has betrayed him, and Iseult dies over his corpse.

Post-death 

French sources, such as the ones chosen in the English translation by Hilaire Belloc in 1903, state that a bramble briar grows out of Tristan's grave, growing so thickly that it forms a bower and roots itself into Iseult's grave. King Mark tries to have the branches cut three separate times, and each time the branches grow back and intertwine. Later versions embellish the story with the briar above Tristan's grave intertwining and a rose tree from Iseult's grave. Other variants replace the intertwining trees with hazel and honeysuckle.

Later versions state that the lovers had several children, including a son and a daughter named after themselves. The children have adventures of their own. In the 14th-century French romance Ysaÿe le Triste (Ysaÿe the Sad), the eponymous hero is the son of Tristan and Iseult. He becomes involved with the fairy king Oberon and marries a girl named Martha, who bears him a son named Mark. Spanish Tristan el Joven also included Tristan's son, referred to as Tristan of Leonis.

Origins and analogs
There are several theories about the tale's origins, although historians disagree over which is the most accurate.

British 
The mid-6th century "Drustanus Stone" in southeast Cornwall close to Castle Dore  has an inscription referring to Drustan, son of Cunomorus (Mark). However, not all historians agree that the Drustan referred to is the archetype of Tristan. The inscription is heavily eroded, but the earliest records of the stone, dating to the 16th century, all agree on some variation of CIRVIVS / CIRUSIUS as the name inscribed. It was first read as a variation of DRUSTANUS in the late 19th century. The optimistic reading corresponds to the 19th-century revival of medieval romance. A 2014 study using 3D scanning supported the initial "CI" reading rather than the backward-facing "D."

There are references to March ap Meichion (Mark) and Trystan in the Welsh Triads, some gnomic poetry, the Mabinogion stories, and the 11th-century hagiography of Illtud. A character called Drystan appears as one of King Arthur's advisers at the end of The Dream of Rhonabwy, a 13th-century tale in the Middle Welsh prose collection known as the Mabinogion. Iseult is also a member of Arthur's court in Culhwch and Olwen, an earlier Mabinogion tale.

Irish
Scholars have given much attention to possible Irish antecedents to the Tristan legend. An ill-fated love triangle is featured in several Irish works, most notably in Tóraigheacht Dhiarmada agus Ghráinne (The Pursuit of Diarmuid and Gráinne). In this literary work, the aging Fionn mac Cumhaill is to marry the young princess, Gráinne. At the betrothal ceremony, she falls in love with Diarmuid Ua Duibhne, one of Fionn's most trusted warriors. Gráinne gives a sleeping potion to all present but Diarmuid Ua Duibhne, and she convinces him to elope with her. Fianna pursues the fugitive lovers across Ireland.

Another Irish analog is Scéla Cano meic Gartnáin, preserved in the 14th-century Yellow Book of Lecan. In this tale, Cano is an exiled Scottish king who accepts the hospitality of King Marcan of Ui Maile. His young wife, Credd, drugs all present and convinces Cano to be her lover. They try to keep a tryst while at Marcan's court, but they are frustrated by courtiers. In the end, Credd kills herself, and Cano dies of grief.

The Ulster Cycle includes the text Clann Uisnigh or Deirdre of the Sorrows in which Naoise mac Usnech falls for Deirdre. However, King Conchobar mac Nessa imprisons her due to a prophecy that Ulster will plunge into civil war due to men fighting for her beauty. Conchobar agrees to marry Deirdre to avert war and avenges Clann Uisnigh. The death of Naoise and his kin leads many Ulstermen to defect to Connacht, including Conchobar's stepfather and trusted ally, Fergus mac Róich. This eventually results in the Irish epic tale Táin Bó Cúailnge.

Persian 
Some scholars suggest that the 11th-century Persian story Vis and Rāmin is the model for the Tristan legend because the similarities are too significant to be coincidental. However, the evidence for the Persian origin of Tristan and Iseult is very circumstantial. Some suggest the Persian story traveled to the West with story-telling exchanges in a Syrian court during crusades. Others believe the story came West with minstrels who had free access to both Crusader and Saracen camps in the Holy Land.

Roman 
Some scholars believe Ovid's Pyramus and Thisbe and the story of Ariadne at Naxos may have contributed to the development of the Tristan legend. The sequence in which Tristan and Iseult die and become interwoven trees also parallels Ovid's love story of Baucis and Philemon, where two lovers transform after death into two trees sprouting from the same trunk. However, this also occurs in the saga of Deirdre of the Sorrows, making the link more tenuous. Moreover, this theory ignores the lost oral traditions of pre-literate societies, relying only on written records that were damaged during the development of modern nation-states such as England and France, especially during the dissolution of the monasteries.

Branches

Common branch
The earliest representation of the so-called common (or "vulgar") branch is Béroul's Le Roman de Tristan (The Romance of Tristan). The first part dates between 1150 and 1170, and the second one dates between 1181 and 1190. The common branch is so named because it represents an earlier non-chivalric, non-courtly tradition of story-telling, making it more reflective of the Dark Ages than the refined High Middle Ages. In this respect, the works in this branch are similar to Layamon's Brut and the Perlesvaus.

Beroul's version is the oldest known version of the Tristan romances, but knowledge of his work is limited. A few substantial fragments of his original version were discovered in the 19th century, with the rest reconstructed from later versions. It is   considered the closest presentation of all the raw events in the romance, with no explanation or modifications. As a result, Beroul's version is an archetype for later "common branch" editions. A more substantial illustration of the common branch is the German version by Eilhart von Oberge. Eilhart was popular but paled in comparison with the later courtly Gottfried.

One aspect of the common branch that differentiates from the courtly branch is the depiction of the lovers' time in exile from Mark's court. While the courtly branch describes Tristan and Iseult as sheltering in a "Cave of Lovers" and living in happy seclusion, the common branches emphasize the extreme suffering that Tristan and Iseult endure. In the common branch, exile is a proper punishment that highlights the couple's departure from courtly norms and emphasizes the impossibility of their romance.

French medievalist Joseph Bédier thought all the Tristan legends could be traced to a single original: a Cornish or Breton poem. He dubbed this hypothetical original the "Ur-Tristan."  Bédier wrote Romance of Tristan and Iseult to reconstruct what this source might have been like, incorporating material from other versions to make a cohesive whole. An English translation of Bédier's Roman de Tristan et Iseut (1900) by Edward J. Gallagher was published in 2013 by Hackett Publishing Company. A translation by Hilaire Belloc, first published in 1913, was published as a Caedmon Audio recording read by Claire Bloom in 1958 and republished in 2005.

Courtly branch
The earliest representation of what scholars name the "courtly" branch of the Tristan legend is in the work of Thomas of Britain, dating from 1173. Unfortunately, only ten fragments of his Tristan poem survived, compiled from six manuscripts. Of these six manuscripts, the ones in Turin and Strasbourg are now lost, leaving two in Oxford, one in Cambridge, and one in Carlisle. In his text, Thomas names another trouvère who also sang of Tristan, though no manuscripts of this earlier version have been discovered. There is also a passage describing Iseult writing a short lai out of grief. This information sheds light on the development of an unrelated legend concerning the death of a prominent troubadour and the composition of lais by noblewomen of the 12th century.

The essential text for knowledge of the courtly branch of the Tristan legend is the abridged translation of Thomas made by Brother Robert at the request of King Haakon Haakonson of Norway in 1227. King Haakon had wanted to promote Angevin-Norman culture at his court, so he commissioned the translation of several French Arthurian works. The Nordic version presents a complete, direct narrative of the events in Thomas' Tristan with the omission of his numerous interpretive diversions. It is the only complete representative of the courtly branch in its formative period.

Chronologically preceding the work of Brother Robert is the Tristan and Isolt of Gottfried von Strassburg, written circa 1211–1215. The poem was Gottfried's only known work and was left incomplete due to his death, with the retelling reaching halfway through the main plot. Authors such as Heinrich von Freiberg and Ulrich von Türheim completed the poem at a later time, but with the common branch of the legend as the source.

Other medieval versions

French
A contemporary of Béroul and Thomas of Britain, Marie de France presented a Tristan episode in her lais, "Chevrefoil". The title refers to the symbiosis of the honeysuckle and hazelnut tree, which die when separated, similar to Tristan and Iseult. It concerns another of Tristan's clandestine returns to Cornwall, with the banished hero signaling his presence to Iseult with an inscribed hazelnut tree branch placed on a road she was to travel. This episode is similar to a version of the courtly branch when Tristan places wood shavings in a stream as a signal for Iseult to meet in the garden of Mark's palace.

There are also two 12th-century Folies Tristan, Old French poems known as the Berne (Folie Tristan de Berne) and the Oxford (Folie Tristan d'Oxford) versions, which tell of Tristan's return to Marc's court under the guise of a madman. Besides their importance as episodic additions to the Tristan story and masterpieces of narrative structure, these relatively short poems significantly restored Béroul's and Thomas' incomplete texts.

Chrétien de Troyes claimed to have written a Tristan story, though it has never been found. Chrétien mentioned this in the introduction to his Cligès, a romance that is anti-Tristan with a happy ending. Some scholars speculate his Tristan was ill-received, prompting Chrétien to write Cligès—a story with no Celtic antecedent—to make amends.

After Béroul and Thomas, the most noteworthy development in French Tristania is a complex grouping of texts known as the Prose Tristan. Extremely popular in the 13th and 14th centuries, these lengthy narratives vary in detail. Modern editions run twelve volumes for the extended version that includes Tristan's participation in the Quest for the Holy Grail. The shorter version without the grail quest consists of five books. The Prose Tristan significantly influenced later medieval literature and inspired parts of the Post-Vulgate Cycle and the Roman de Palamedes.

English and Welsh
The earliest complete source of Tristan's story in English was Sir Tristrem, a   romantic poem in the courtly style with 3,344 lines. It is part of the Auchinleck manuscript at the National Library of Scotland. As with many medieval English adaptations of French Arthuriana, the poem's artistic achievement is average. However, some critics have tried to rehabilitate it, claiming it is a parody. Its first editor, Walter Scott, provided a sixty-line ending to the story that was included in every subsequent edition.

Thomas Malory's The Book of Sir Tristram de Lyones is the only other medieval handling of the Tristan legend in English. Malory provided a shortened translation of the French Prose Tristan and included it in his Arthurian romance compilation Le Morte d'Arthur. In Malory's version, Tristram is the son of the King of Lyonesse. Since the Winchester Manuscript surfaced in 1934, there has been much scholarly debate on whether the Tristan narrative, like all the episodes in Le Morte d'Arthur, was intended to be an independent piece or part of a more extensive work.

A short Tristan narrative, perhaps related to the Béroul text, exists in six Welsh manuscripts dating from the late 16th to the mid-17th century.

Italian and Spanish
In Italy, many cantari or oral poems performed in the public square about Tristan or referencing him. These poems include Cantari di Tristano, Due Tristani Quando Tristano e Lancielotto combattiero al petrone di Merlino, Ultime Imprese e Morte Tristano, and Vendetta che fe Messer Lanzelloto de la Morte di Messer Tristano, among others.

There are also four versions of the Prose Tristan in medieval Italy, named after the place of composition or library where they are housed: Tristano Panciaticchiano (Panciatichi family library), Tristano Riccardiano (Biblioteca Riccardiana), and Tristano Veneto (Venetian). The exception to this is La Tavola Ritonda, a 15th-century Italian rewrite of the Prose Tristan.

In the first third of the 14th century, Arcipreste de Hita wrote his version of the Tristan story, Carta Enviada por Hiseo la Brunda a Tristán. Respuesta de Tristán is a unique 15th-century romance written as imaginary letters between the two lovers. Libro del muy esforzado caballero Don Tristán de Leonís y de sus grandes hechos en armas, a Spanish reworking of the Prose Tristan that was first published in Valladolid in 1501.

Nordic and Dutch
The popularity of Brother Robert's version spawned a parody, Saga Af Tristram ok Ísodd and the poem Tristrams kvæði. Two poems with Arthurian content have been preserved in the collection of Old Norse prose translations of Marie de France's lais Strengleikar (Stringed Instruments). One of these is "Chevrefoil", translated as "Geitarlauf".

The Austrian National Library in Vienna is in possession of a 158-line fragment of a  Dutch version of Thomas' Tristan.

Slavic
A 13th-century verse romance based on the German Tristan poems by Gottfried, Heinrich, and Eilhart was written in Old Czech. It is the only known verse representative of the Tristan story in Slavic languages.

The Old Belarusian prose Povest o Tryshchane from the 1560s represents the furthest Eastern advance of the legend. Some scholars believe it to be the last medieval Tristan or Arthurian text period. Its lineage goes back to the Tristano Veneto. At that time, the Republic of Venice controlled large parts of the Serbo-Croatian language area, encouraging a more active literary and cultural life than most of the Balkans. The manuscript of the Povest states it was translated from a lost Serbian intermediary. Scholars assume the legend traveled from Venice through its Balkan colonies, finally reaching the last outpost in this Slavic language.

Visual art

Various art forms from the medieval era represented Tristan's story, from ivory mirror cases to the 13th-century Sicilian Tristan Quilt. In addition, many literary versions are illuminated with miniatures. The legend also became a popular subject for Romanticist painters of the late 19th and early 20th centuries.

Modern adaptations

Literature
In English, the Tristan story generally suffered the same fate as the Matter of Britain. However, after being ignored for about three centuries, a renaissance of original Arthurian literature took place in the late 19th and early 20th centuries. Revival material includes Alfred Tennyson's "The Last Tournament" which is part of one of his Idylls of the King, Matthew Arnold's 1852 Tristram and Iseult, and Algernon Charles Swinburne's 1882 epic poem Tristram of Lyonesse. Other compilers wrote Tristan's texts as prose novels or short stories.

By the 19th century, the Tristan legend spread across the Nordic world, from Denmark to the Faroe Islands. However, these stories diverged from their medieval precursors. For instance, in one Danish ballad, Tristan and Iseult are brother and sister. In two popular Danish chapbooks of the late 18th century, Tristans Saga ok Inionu and En Tragoedisk Historie om den ædle og Tappre Tistrand, Iseult is a princess of India. The popularity of these chapbooks inspired Icelandic poets Sigurður Breiðfjörð and Níels Jónsson to write rímur, long verse narratives inspired by the Tristan legend.

Cornish writer Arthur Quiller-Couch started writing Castle Dor, a retelling of the Tristan and Iseult myth in modern circumstances. He designated an innkeeper as King Mark, his wife as Iseult, and a Breton onion-seller as Tristan. The plot was set in Troy, the fictional name of his hometown of Fowey. The book was left unfinished at Quiller-Couch's death in 1944 and was completed in 1962 by Daphne du Maurier.

Rosemary Sutcliff wrote two novels based on the story of Tristan and Iseult. The first, Tristan and Iseult, is a 1971 retelling of the story for young adults, set in Cornwall in the southern peninsula of Britain. The story appears again as a chapter of Sutcliff's 1981 Arthurian novel, The Sword and the Circle. Thomas Berger retold the story of Tristan and Isolde in his 1978 interpretation of the Arthurian legend, Arthur Rex: A Legendary Novel. Dee Morrison Meaney told the tale from Iseult's perspective in the 1985 novel Iseult, focusing on the magical side of the story and how the arrival of the Saxons ended the druidic tradition and magical creatures.

Diana L. Paxson's 1988 novel The White Raven told the legend of Tristan and Iseult (named in the book as Drustan and Esseilte) from the perspective of Iseult's handmaiden Brangien (Branwen), who was mentioned in various of the medieval stories. Joseph Bédier's Romance of Tristan and Iseult is quoted as a source by John Updike in the afterword to his 1994 novel Brazil about the lovers Tristão and Isabel. Bernard Cornwell included a historical interpretation of the legend as a side story in Enemy of God: A Novel of Arthur, a 1996 entry in The Warlord Chronicles series. Rosalind Miles wrote a trilogy about Tristan and Isolde: The Queen of the Western Isle (2002), The Maid of the White Hands (2003), and The Lady of the Sea (2004). Nancy McKenzie wrote Prince of Dreams: A Tale of Tristan and Essylte as part of her Arthurian series in 2003. In Bengali literature, Sunil Gangopadhyay depicts the story in the novel Sonali Dukkho. In Harry Turtledove's alternate history Ruled Britannia, Christopher Marlowe writes a play called Yseult and Tristan to compete with his friend William Shakespeare's immensely popular Hamlet.

Theater and opera
In 1832, Gaetano Donizetti referenced this story in his opera L'elisir d'amore (The Elixir of Love or The Love Potion) in Milan. The character Adina sings the story to the ensemble, inspiring Nemorino to ask the charlatan Dulcamara for the magic elixir.

Premiering in 1865, Richard Wagner's influential opera Tristan und Isolde depicts Tristan as a doomed romantic figure, while Isolde fulfills Wagner's quintessential feminine role as the redeeming woman. Swiss composer Frank Martin wrote the chamber opera Le Vin Herbé between 1938 and 1940 after being influenced by Wagner.

Thomas Hardy published his one-act play The Famous Tragedy of the Queen of Cornwall at Tintagel in Lyonnesse in 1923. Rutland Boughton's 1924 opera The Queen of Cornwall was based on Thomas Hardy's play.

Music
Twentieth-century composers have often used the legend with Wagnerian overtones in their compositions. For instance, Hans Werner Henze's orchestral composition Tristan borrowed freely from the Wagnerian version and other retellings of the legend.

English composer Rutland Boughton composed the music drama The Queen of Cornwall, inspired by Hardy's play. Its first performance was at the Glastonbury Festival in 1924. Feeling that Hardy's play offered too much-unrelieved grimness, Broughton received permission to import a handful of lyrics from Hardy's early poetical works. In 2010, it was recorded on the Dutton Epoch label with Ronald Corp conducted the New London Orchestra and members of the London Chorus, including soloists Neal Davies (King Mark), Heather Shipp (Queen Iseult), Jacques Imbrailo (Sir Tristam), and Joan Rodgers (Iseult of Brittany).

Olivier Messiaen built his 1948 symphony Turangalîla-Symphonie around the story. German power metal band Blind Guardian have a song inspired by Tristan and Iseult's story, "The Maiden and the Minstrel Knight", in their 2002 album A Night at the Opera. English singer and songwriter Patrick Wolf featured a song about the Tristan and Iseult legend, "Tristan", in his 2005 album Wind in the Wires. American indie rock band Tarkio has a song entitled "Tristan and Iseult" in their album Sea Songs for Landlocked Sailers.

Film and television
The story has also been adapted into film many times. The earliest is probably the 1909 French silent film Tristan et Yseult. Another French film of the same name was released two years later and offered a unique addition to the story: Tristan's jealous slave Rosen tricks the lovers into drinking the love potion, then denounces them to Mark. Mark pities the two lovers, but they commit double suicide anyway. There is also a French silent film version from 1920 closely following the legend.

One of the most celebrated and controversial Tristan films was 1943's L'Éternel Retour (The Eternal Return), directed by Jean Delannoy with a screenplay by Jean Cocteau. It is a contemporary retelling of the story with a man named Patrice in the role of Tristan, who fetches a wife for his friend Marke. However, an evil dwarf tricks them into drinking a love potion, and the familiar plot ensues. The film was made in France during the Vichy regime under German domination. Elements of the movie reflect National Socialist ideology, with the beautiful blonde hero and heroine offset by the Untermensch dwarf. The dwarf has a more prominent role than in most interpretations of the legend; its conniving rains havoc on the lovers, much like the Jews of Nazi stereotypes.

The 1970 Spanish film Tristana is only tangentially related to the story. The role of Tristan is assumed by the female character Tristana, who cares for her aging uncle, Don Lope. However, she wishes to marry Horacio. The 1981 Irish film Lovespell features Nicholas Clay as Tristan and Kate Mulgrew as Iseult. Coincidentally, Clay went on to play Lancelot in John Boorman's epic Excalibur. The German film Fire and Sword (Feuer und Schwert – Die Legende von Tristan und Isolde) premiered at the Cannes Film Festival in 1981 and was released in 1982. The film starred Christoph Waltz as Tristan and was regarded as accurate to the story, though it removed the Iseult of Brittany's subplot.

French director François Truffaut adapted the subject to modern times for his 1981 film La Femme d'à côté (The Woman Next Door), while 1988's In the Shadow of the Raven transported the characters to medieval Iceland. In the latter, Trausti and Isolde are warriors from rival tribes who come into conflict when Trausti kills the leader of Isolde's tribe. However, a local bishop makes peace between the two and arranges for their marriage. Bollywood director Subhash Ghai transferred the story to modern India and the United States in his 1997 musical Pardes.

The legend received a high-budget treatment with 2006's Tristan & Isolde, produced by Tony Scott and Ridley Scott, written by Dean Georgaris, directed by Kevin Reynolds, and starring James Franco and Sophia Myles. In this version, Tristan is a Cornish warrior raised from a young age by Lord Marke after being orphaned when his parents are killed. In a fight with the Irish, Tristan defeats Morholt, the Irish King's second, but is poisoned during the battle, which dulls his senses. Believing Tristan is dead, his companions send him off in a boat meant to cremate a dead body. Meanwhile, Isolde leaves her home over an unwilling betrothal to Morholt and finds Tristan on the Irish coast.

An animated TV series, Tristán & Isolda: La Leyenda Olvidada, aired in Spain and France in 1998. The 2002 French animated phil Tristan et Iseut is a redacted version of the traditional tale aimed at a family audience.

See also

Antony and Cleopatra
Romeo and Juliet
Pyramus and Thisbe
Canoel
Medieval hunting (terminology)

Notes and references

External links

 Overview of the story
 "Romance of Tristan and Isolde" (free PDF ebook) 
 Tristan page from the Camelot Project
 Bibliography of Modern Tristania in English
 
   Béroul's Le Roman de Tristan
  Thomas d'Angleterre's  Tristan
  Tristan and Iseult, audio version 

 
Arthurian characters
Arthurian literature
Breton mythology and folklore
Celtic mythology
Cornwall in fiction
Literary duos
Love stories
Mythological lovers
Welsh mythology